Lee Jin-woo (born  1972) is a Paralympic boccia player of South Korea. He won a silver medal at the 1988 Summer Paralympics, a gold at the 1992 Summer Paralympics, and a gold and a silver at the 2000 Summer Paralympics.

He began playing the sport in around 1987.

References 

Boccia players at the 2000 Summer Paralympics
Boccia players at the 1992 Summer Paralympics
Boccia players at the 1988 Summer Paralympics
Paralympic gold medalists for South Korea
1972 births
Living people
Medalists at the 2000 Summer Paralympics
Medalists at the 1992 Summer Paralympics
Medalists at the 1988 Summer Paralympics
Paralympic silver medalists for South Korea
Paralympic boccia players of South Korea
Paralympic medalists in boccia